Operation Seven Swords is a 1987 role-playing game supplement for Living Steel, a post-apocalyptic cyberpunk role-playing game set on several different worlds, published by Leading Edge Games.

Contents
Operation Seven Swords presents more details on the universe of the Living Steel game.

Reception
In the May 1988 edition of Dragon (Issue 133), Ken Rolston liked the entire Living Steel setting, commenting that "These dramatic adventures are stylishly presented, and the theme and tone feature an appealingly ambivalent mixture of honorable heroism and grim cynicism... This is good stuff."

In issue No. 33 of Challenge magazine, Julia Martin found that "Operation Seven Swords is well-written and useful. In fact, it is so useful, one wonders why the information included in it was not included in Living Steel."

Other reviews
White Wolf #9 (1988)
 Casus Belli #42 (Dec 1987)

References

Role-playing game supplements introduced in 1987
Science fiction role-playing game supplements